Virginia Sandhya Peiris (born 27 November 1952 as වීණා ජයකොඩි) [Sinhala]), better known as Veena Jayakody, is an actress in Sri Lankan cinema, stage drama and television. Jayakody started as a child artist and has played critically acclaimed roles in films Sagarayak Meda, Ra Manamali and Sarungalaya.

Personal life
Veena Jayakodi was born on 27 November 1952. Her mother, Rohini Jayakody, was a popular actress and a film director. She studied as Holy Family Convent, Bambalapitiya.

Veena has three children – one daughter and two sons. Eldest daughter is Anjana, eldest son is Chandu and youngest son is Sanjay. Anjana is married to Srini and they have two children – Waishya and Kaushik. Chandu is married to Melonie and the couple has three children – Jason, Tharaa and Joshua.

Acting career
Jayakody started her film career with Ahankara Sthree back in 1954, directed by A. B. Raj as a 5-month-old child with her mother. At the age of 12, Jayakody acted in 1968 film Hangi Hora directed by her mother Rohini Jayakody, where she acted as a dancer. At the age of 14, she acted in a Vesak drama Kohomada Wade. In the meantime, she studied dance under Pramila Kuruppu, Daya Nellampitiya and Rudrani Liyanage. Later she learned Kathakali dance from Sirimathi Rasadari. When she was a child, she acted as the daughter in the Vijaya Kuveni stage drama when her mother was 'Kuveni'. At school, she also played the role of 'Kisa' in the play 'Kundala Keshi'.

The she played the role of 'Gunapali' in the stage play Sivamma Dhanapala. After the tragic death of lead actress Rukmani Devi, Venna got the role of 'Sivamma'. After that she acted in plays such as Siripala Saha Ran Menika and Dwithwa. Later she won an award for the play Uruvisi. But in time and on long journeys, she had to retired from the stage when she got sick because of the lack of facilities.

Then she moved to television serials, started with the serial Aththa Bidei directed by Henry Jayasena. She later made a popular role 'Sudharma' in the critically acclaimed serial Doo Daruwo.

Notable teledramas

 Ahanna Kenek Na
 Amarapuraya
 Aragalaya
 Bhavana – Akala Rathriya
 Bopath Sakkiya
 Eth Kanda Lihini
 Ganga Addara
 Giri Shikara Meda
 Hirusanda Maima
 Kota Uda Mandira
 Kulavilokanaya
 Laabai Apple
 Kele Handa
 Oba Mageya
 Nadeeladiya
 Ruwata Ruwa
 Samanala Sihinaya
 Sanda Mudunata
 Sasandara
 Sihina Kumari
 Sudu Kapuru Pethi
 Wahinna Muthu Wassak

Filmography

Awards and accolades
She has won several awards at the local film festivals and television festivals.

Presidential Awards

|-
|| 1982 ||| Ra Manamali || Best Actress ||

References

External links

Sri Lankan film actresses
Living people
1952 births